Monamour is a 2006 Italian erotic romance film directed by Tinto Brass.

Plot
Marta is a young nymphomaniac housewife, married to Dario, a successful book publisher. Although she still loves her husband, Marta hasn't been able to achieve sexual satisfaction for months due to their dull and predictable love life. While staying in Mantua for the Festivaletteratura, a book fair, Marta follows the advice of her scheming friend Sylvia and pursues an affair with a handsome and mysterious artist named Leon, which leads to surprising results regarding her failing marriage with Dario.

Principal cast

Availability
The film is available to buy in DVD format on sites such as Amazon.com. The Blu-ray Disc version is out on 19 April 2011.

References

External links 

2006 films
2006 LGBT-related films
2000s erotic drama films
Films directed by Tinto Brass
Italian erotic drama films
Italian LGBT-related films
Lesbian-related films
Bisexuality-related films
Female bisexuality in film
2000s Italian-language films
Adultery in films
2006 drama films
2000s Italian films